Balanophotannin D is a hydrolyzable tannin found in Balanophora japonica. It contains an oxidized hexahydroxydiphenoyl (HHDP) group.

References 

Hydrolysable tannins